Wigmund (archbishop of York)
Wigmund (bishop of Dorchester)
Wigmund of Mercia